The 76th running of the Tour of Flanders cycling classic was held on Sunday, 5 April 1992. French rider Jacky Durand gained an upset victory. For the first time in the Tour of Flanders' history, a rider from the early breakaway stayed ahead until the finish. The race was the second leg of the UCI Road World Cup. 123 of 186 riders finished.

Route
The race started in Sint-Niklaas and finished in Meerbeke (Ninove) – totaling 260 km.
The course featured 14 categorized climbs:

Results

External links
 Video of the 1992 Tour of Flanders  on Sporza (in Dutch)

References

Tour of Flanders
Tour of Flanders
Tour of Flanders
Tour Of Flanders
April 1992 sports events in Europe